Leonard Christopher Gordon Rogers (born 29 April 1954) is a mathematician working in probability theory and quantitative finance. He is Emeritus  Professor of Statistical Science in the Statistical Laboratory, University of Cambridge.

Rogers' specialist fields include stochastic analysis and applications to quantitative finance. With David Williams he has written two influential textbooks on diffusion processes.

He was awarded the Mayhew Prize of Cambridge University in 1976, and the Rollo Davidson Prize in 1984. He was elected an Honorary Fellow of the Institute of Actuaries in 2003.

Rogers was an undergraduate at St John's College, Cambridge, where he graduated in 1975 and completed his PhD in 1980. He has held positions at several UK universities, including Warwick University (1980–1983), University College of Swansea (1983–1985), Cambridge University (1985–1991), Queen Mary and Westfield College (1991–1994), and the University of Bath (1994–2002). He was elected to the Cambridge Professorship of Statistical Science in 2002.

Selected publications

References

20th-century English mathematicians
21st-century English mathematicians
Living people
Alumni of St John's College, Cambridge
Cambridge mathematicians
Probability theorists
1954 births
Academics of the University of Warwick
Academics of Swansea University
Academics of Queen Mary University of London
Academics of the University of Bath
Professors of the University of Cambridge